Laura Kahunde is a Ugandan performing artist and Reality T.V Show Host. She Hosts Our Perfect Wedding Uganda, a reality show that follows Ugandan couples from the wedding preparations to the actual wedding day events. She also currently plays Jussy on Kyaddala, a pan-African story told through the lives of university friends exploring sexual reproductive health, rights and challenges, among other social issues and; Catherine Musoke on Chapters series that shows on pearl Magic Prime. She portrayed the character Angella Byekwaso on the famous NTV Second Chance (Ugandan telenovela) She is known to have starred in Mariam Ndagire's films Hearts in Pieces alongside Abby Mukiibi Nkaaga, Dear mum and most recently my husbands wife Where We Belong, and Dear Mum with Mariam Ndagire herself. She also starred in the Usama Mukwaya's Hello that won her the best actress in the 2011 MNFPAC students awards. She recently appeared in a Henry Ssali film Bullion with her sister Juliana Kanyomozi She is confirmed to work with Usama Mukwaya again on his upcoming film Love Faces alongside Moses Kiboneka Jr. and Patriq Nkakalukanyi and a Douglas Dubois Sebamala film Black Glove.

Personal life
Laura is the last born of Prince Gerald Manyindo and Catherine Manyindo. She is also a cousin to King Oyo, the reigning Omukama of Toro, in Western Uganda and a sister to singer and actress Juliana Kanyomozi and together they appear in the movie, Bullion.

References

External links
 
 

Living people
Ugandan film actresses
21st-century Ugandan actresses
People from Kampala
1988 births